Serge Moati (born Henry Moati; 17 August 1946) is a French journalist, television presenter, film director and writer. He is the brother of Nine Moati, author of the novel  Les Belles de Tunis. As is his sister, Serge Moati is a French citizen, with Tunisian-Jewish origins. He is the father of the actor Félix Moati.

Moati was formerly a political consultant/public relations manager for François Mitterrand.

Filmography 
 Changer la vie, Mitterrand 1981-1983 (2011) - TV movie
 Je vous ai compris: De Gaulle 1958-1962 (2010) - TV movie
 Roses à crédit (2010) - producer
 Mitterrand à Vichy (2008) - TV movie
 Les mitterrand's' (2006) - TV documentary 
 Capitaines des ténèbres (2005) - TV movie
 Radio France: 24 heures sur 24 (2003) - TV documentary
 Un an après (2003) - TV documentary
 Tous en scène! Ou spectacles d'une élection (2002) - TV movie
 Une vie ordinaire ou Mes questions sur l'homosexualité (2001) - TV documentary
 Les complices (1999) - TV movie
 Maison de famille (1999) - TV movie
 Jésus (1999) - TV movie
 Un mois de réflexion (1998) - TV movie
 Sapho (1997) - TV movie
 Le secret de Bastien (1997) - TV movie
 Parfum de famille (1997) - TV movie
 Tendre piège (1996) - TV movie
 Une page d'amour (1995) - TV movie
 Une femme dans la tourmente (1995) - TV movie
 Des feux mal éteints (1994)
 Edwige Feuillère en scène (1993) - TV movie
 Dix ans après (1991) - documentary
 Le piège (1991) - TV movie
 Olympe de nos amours (1989) - TV movie
 L'été de tous les chagrins (1989) - TV movie
 La croisade des enfants (1988) - TV movie
 Les sept jours du marié (1982) - TV movie
 T'es grand et puis t'oublies (1981) - TV movie
 Mon enfant, ma mère (1981) - TV movie
 Mont-Oriol (1980) - TV movie
 Yan Diga - Ils traverseront des pays comme des jardins (1979)
 Ciné-roman (1978) - TV movie
 Rossel et la commune de Paris (1977) - TV movie
 Golden Night (1976)
 Le pain noir (1974-1975) - TV mini-series
 Le sagouin (1972) - TV movie

Books 
 Villa Jasmin (Fayard 2003)
 Du côté des vivants (Fayard 2006)

References

External links 

 

1946 births
Living people
Writers from Tunis
Tunisian Jews
Tunisian emigrants to France
French film directors
French film producers
French journalists
French male non-fiction writers
French male screenwriters
French people of Tunisian-Jewish descent
French screenwriters
French television talk show hosts
21st-century French writers
21st-century French screenwriters